Prussian Diet may refer to:

 Prussian estates (1370s-1848)
 Prussian Landtag (1848-1933)